Romelcia Phillip (born 29 August 1998) is a Dominican footballer who plays as a forward for the Dominica women's national team.

International career
Phillip represented Dominica during the 2012 CONCACAF Women's U-17 Championship qualification. She capped at senior level during two CONCACAF W Championship qualifications (2018 and 2022).

References

External links
 LSU–Alexandria Generals bio

1998 births
Living people
People from Roseau
Dominica women's footballers
Women's association football forwards
Dominica women's international footballers
LSU–Alexandria Generals
College women's soccer players in the United States
Dominica expatriate footballers
Expatriate women's soccer players in the United States
Dominica expatriate sportspeople in the United States